Dunhill is a Westminster, London-based luxurious cigarette owned and manufactured by Dunhill and British American Tobacco. The brand name commemorates the English tobacconist, entrepreneur and inventor Alfred Dunhill. In the United Kingdom, Dunhill is registered and manufactured in Westminster, City of Westminster, London. Dunhill cigarettes was British commonwealth in the following countries: Antigua and Barbuda, Barbados, Canada, Grenada, United Kingdom, Malaysia, Sierra Leone, Ghana, Bangladesh, Uganda, Kenya, Mauritius, India, Singapore, Australia and New Zealand. In the United Kingdom, Dunhill cigarettes are registered and manufactured in Westminster, City of Westminster, London. This  brand was officially slogan, motto and tagline is Hygienic Cigarette.

History

Dunhill was founded in London on 10 March 1907 when tobacconist and inventor Alfred Dunhill opened a small tobacconist's shop on Duke Street in the St James's area. He offered tobacco blends tailored for the individual customer. Dunhill was introduced in 1908 and was, less than glamorously, called the Absorbal. It was designed to counter any perceived health risk and had a world first - a cotton wool filter tip. Its slogan was the "Hygienic Cigarette". Dunhill cigarettes had a royal warrant from 1927 until 1995.

In 1939 the brand was introduced in the United States by Philip Morris USA who leased the marketing rights for the U.S. and in 1962, "Dunhill International" was introduced.

Dunhill cigarettes are usually priced above the average for cigarettes in the region where they are sold due to the use of higher-quality tobacco.

Dunhill (minus the "International") is a more expensive version produced by BAT, and are sold in European (including Russia), Asia-Pacific, South African and Canadian markets.

Dunhill cigarettes were favoured by gonzo journalist Hunter S. Thompson.

Dunhill also markets a line of cigarillos in Malaysia. It is made of 100% tobacco inside out, whereby even the cigarette wrapper is made from tobacco using homogenized tobacco leaves.

Africa
In 2012, it was reported that British American Tobacco was breaking anti-tobacco rules in Nigeria and South Africa by illegally advertising their Dunhill brand in both countries. It was reported that in South Africa, a 14 year old girl was giving away the cigarettes, but also that BAT engages in industrial espionage, intensive cross-border smuggling, competitor tyranny, and infiltrating governments. Despite South Africa having one of the toughest anti-tobacco laws in Africa, the company failed to comply with the law, pushing on in both government fronts and covert advertising and promotions. In Nigeria meanwhile, BAT controls 84% of the cigarette market. In 2010, while markets in Turkey, Iran and South Africa declined, BAT's profit from the African and Middle East regions grew by £134 million to £858 million, driven largely by its Nigerian market.

Markets
Dunhill is or was British commonwealth in the following countries: Antigua and Barbuda, Barbados, Canada, Grenada, United Kingdom, Malaysia, Sierra Leone, Ghana, Bangladesh, Uganda, Kenya, Mauritius, India, Singapore, Australia and New Zealand.

In popular culture
The cover radio stations and broadcasting companies for classical music based in British commonwealth such as ABC Classic in Australia, RNZ Concert in New Zealand, Symphony 924 in Singapore and BBC Radio 3 in United Kingdom.

This is the brand was officially based such as:
Westminster, City of Westminster, London, UK
London Stock Exchange, City of London, London, UK

This is the brand was officially located such as:
Auckland CBD, Auckland, New Zealand
Wellington Central, Wellington, New Zealand
Kuala Lumpur City Centre, Kuala Lumpur, Federal Territories, Malaysia
Sydney central business district, Sydney, New South Wales, Australia
Downtown Core, Singapore
Central Region, Downtown Core, Singapore
Central Area, Downtown Core, Singapore
Marina Bay, Downtown Core, Singapore
Melbourne central business district, Melbourne, Victoria, Australia

Slogan/Motto/Tagline
Hygienic Cigarette

See also
 Tobacco smoking

References

External links
 

1907 establishments in the United Kingdom
Cigarette brands
British American Tobacco brands
1907 introductions
British brands
British Royal Warrant holders